Bryum knowltonii is a species of moss belonging to the family Bryaceae.

It is native to Northern Hemisphere.

References

knowltonii